Electoral district of Syndal was an electoral district of the Legislative Assembly in the Australian state of Victoria.

Members

Election results

References

Former electoral districts of Victoria (Australia)
1967 establishments in Australia
1992 disestablishments in Australia
Constituencies established in 1967
Constituencies disestablished in 1992